Cathy Kratzert Gerring (born April 28, 1961) is an American professional golfer who played on the LPGA Tour.

Born Cathy Kratzert, in Fort Wayne, Indiana, she played college golf at Ohio State University.

Gerring won three times on the LPGA Tour, all in 1990. She played on the 1990 Solheim Cup team.

In April 1992, Gerring was severely burned in a hospitality tent at the LPGA's Sara Lee Classic in Nashville, Tennessee. Due to her injuries, she did not play again on the LPGA Tour until 1996.

Gerring's brother, Billy Kratzert, won four times on the PGA Tour. They are one of only two brother/sister pairs to win on both tours (the other is Jim Gallagher Jr. and Jackie Gallagher-Smith).

Professional wins

LPGA Tour wins (3)

LPGA Tour playoff record (1–4)

Team appearances
Professional
Solheim Cup (representing the United States): 1990 (winners)

References

External links

American female golfers
Ohio State Buckeyes women's golfers
LPGA Tour golfers
Solheim Cup competitors for the United States
Golfers from Indiana
Sportspeople from Fort Wayne, Indiana
1961 births
Living people